Encinal High School is a co-educational public high school serving grades 6-12. It is located in Alameda, California, United States, and is part of the Alameda Unified School District.

Threatened closure
The school was one of several in the Alameda district that was said to face closure depending on the success or failure of Measure E, a $150-per-parcel property tax increase voted on by mail-in ballot.  Measure E was defeated when it failed to garner the required two-thirds majority; however, the school did reopen in fall 2010.

Demographics
The student body is 23% African-American, 20% White non-Hispanic, 39% Asian, 15% Hispanic or Latino, 1% American Indian or Alaskan Native, 1% Pacific Islander, and 1% multiple ethnicity or no response, according to the California Department of Education, for the 2005-2006 school year.

College and work preparation

SAT
56% of students take the SAT.
Average SAT scores are 400 verbal and 420 math.

Continuing education

86% of graduates will attend two- or four-year colleges.
21% of graduates will attend University of California.
25% of graduates will attend California State University.

Courses offered
Encinal offers seventeen Advanced Placement courses: AP Biology, AP Chemistry, AP English Language and Composition, AP English Literature and Composition, AP Environmental Science, AP World History, AP Art History AP French Language, AP United States Government and Politics, AP US History, AP Spanish Language, AP Statistics, AP Art and Design Program (Photography), AP Computer Science Principles, AP Computer Science A, AP Calculus AB, and AP Calculus BC.
The school also offers three special school-to-career programs in radio communications and broadcasting, finance and marketing, and Biotechnology (in association with Alameda High School & Laney College)

Other
Encinal High School has an Academic Performance Index of 7/10. However, when compared to socioeconomically similar schools, its API is a 9/10.
Encinal is the only high school in the city of Alameda to have open-enrollment AP classes.
Encinal High School shared its campus with the Alameda Community Learning Center but since the 2013–2014 school year it has shared the space with the Junior Jets (a 6-8 middle school)
Encinal High School has an armory below its gym, where JROTC used to be taught.

Student budget protests

April 1, 2010 budget teach-in

On April 1, 2010, about 200 students attending Encinal High School staged a "teach-in" protest in light of possible further budget cuts from the AUSD and closure of the school. Teachers and students planned a series of classes that were divided into two sessions with a break in between that included free food (from the Barbeque Club) and live music from certain Encinal staff members. Most of the classes were led by teachers, but two were taught by seniors (including a "no boundaries" music class led by Matt Ortega). The students who attended showcased their Jet Pride by participating in a variety of unique classes including how to make salt water taffy through chemistry, protest poetry and art, a music class with no musical boundaries, and cow eyeball dissection. A small point that the coordinators of this event wanted to get across was the date that was chosen for it: April 1, 2010 was the Thursday before Encinal's spring break began.

March 2008 student walkouts
On March 5, 2008, about 1,000 students from Encinal High School walked out of class to protest the budget cuts for the 2008–2009 school year. The budget cuts were a result of the $4 billion budget cut approved by California governor Arnold Schwarzenegger. The cuts would eliminate many school sports and Advanced Placement classes, and lay off about 46 teachers. The walkout began at Encinal High where students marched to the Alameda Unified School District (AUSD) offices located on the Alameda High campus, where the 1,000 Encinal students were joined by many more students from Alameda High. After about a half-hour of chanting protests outside the District offices, AUSD superintendent Ardella Dailey invited the walking out students into the Kofman Auditorium to try to explain why the cuts were required.

Text messaging technology, as well as social networking sites, such as MySpace, Facebook, and YouTube, helped the students coordinate and announce the walkout. Before they reached the district office, many Encinal students text messaged students at Alameda High. Aware of the walkout only when the Encinal students reached the district office, Alameda High officials were unable to prevent their students from leaving class. They were all marked with cleared absences.

Other student activities

Athletics
Encinal High has several varsity sports, including:
Badminton
Basketball
Baseball
Cheerleading
Cross country
Football
Golf
Soccer
Softball
Swimming
Tennis
Track & field
Volleyball
Water polo

North Coast Section titles in Football
1980- Encinal defeated St. Patrick 21-3
2008- Encinal defeated Novato 35-28

The Jets are a member of the West Alameda County Conference (WACC 12).

Encinal High, Alameda High School, and St. Joseph Notre Dame High School collectively field men's and women's rugby union teams.

North Coast Section titles in Football:
1980- Encinal defeated St. Patrick 21-3
2008- Encinal defeated Novato 35-28

Partnership with Jetsetters

Jetsetters has partnered up with Encinal to provide ROP classes for students such as Drivers' Education, Dancing, and Arts & Crafts. They also have an after school program designed to help students in need.

Clubs
Sanctioned clubs at the school include:
Art Club
Badminton Club
Black Student Union
DECA
Filipino Club
Gender and Sexuality Alliance
Hispanic Club
Interact Club
Key Club
National Honor Society
Red Cross Youth Club
Fishing Club
Muslim Student Alliance
Model United Nations
Jazz Band
Book Club

Marching band
The Encinal High Jets band, the Marching Jets, is led by Band Director Anthony Gennaro. Throughout the year, the musicians compete in band reviews all over Northern California and hold the Island Winterguard show every March. During the 2005–2006 school year, the band placed in the top three in every review they entered. During the 2016–2017 school year, the band took first place in their division at every review they attended, including taking first place at the Santa Cruz Band Review for the third year in a row.

Drama 
Encinal High School dramatic arts program was run by Robert Moorhead until his retirement in 2016. The drama department has performed Les Misérables, Hamlet, and The Sound of Music. In the spring of 2006 Encinal High performed Cats. In the winter of 2007, Encinal High School performed Twelve Angry Men. In 2008 they performed Angels in America. They were the first high school to do so.  They also performed Carousel. In 2009 they became one of the first schools in the country to perform the school edition of Rent. In 2010 they performed the classic musical West Side Story. In 2011 they performed their version of Seussical, a Dr. Seuss musical. In 2012 they performed the classic musical Anything Goes. In 2013 they performed a high school version of the musical Hair, although without the nudity of the traditional version. In 2014 they performed the musical Hairspray. In 2015 they performed In the Heights. In 2016 they performed Annie.

FM radio station 
Encinal High students operate the low-power FM radio station KJTZ-LP.

Miscellaneous

The school mascot is a Marine Corps A-4 Skyhawk attack jet, a tribute to the military heritage of the town and to the now-closed Naval Air Station on the west end of the island.  In 2004 there was a dispute as to whether the mascot symbolized war, and some people wanted to have it removed.  The jet was not removed, after a show of support from the students and the community.
Most students come from the Academy of Alameda (formerly Chipman Middle School) or Wood Middle School.
The TV show MythBusters sometimes uses the school's facilities in its experiments, including the pool and football field. In 2006 Mythbusters held a Q&A event in Alameda to raise funds for the school.
Eileen Walsh, spouse of Jamie Hyneman from MythBusters, was a teacher at Encinal High School.
President Obama posed for a photo with Jamie Hyneman and Adam Savage from MythBusters while holding an Encinal Jets hooded sweatshirt in December 2009.

Notable alumni
 Ray Crouse - former NFL and CFL player
 Tommy Harper - baseball player for the Boston Red Sox
 Curt Motton - baseball player for the Baltimore Orioles
 Isaiah Rider - NBA player and 1994 Slam Dunk Champion
 Jimmy Rollins - Former MLB shortstop for the Philadelphia Phillies, Los Angeles Dodgers, and Chicago White Sox; 2007 NL MVP; 2008 World Series Champion
 Willie Stargell - Pirates Hall of Fame baseball player
 Junior Tautalatasi - former NFL player
 Dontrelle Willis - MLB pitcher for the Detroit Tigers; 2003 NL Rookie of the Year; 2003 World Series Champion
 John Wimberley - Photographic Artist
 Brigette Lundy-Paine - Actor

References

External links
Encinal High School homepage
Encinal High School Alumni site
"Encinal students stage learn-in"

Buildings and structures in Alameda, California
High schools in Alameda County, California
Educational institutions established in 1952
Public high schools in California
1952 establishments in California
High school radio stations in the United States